The Capture of Fort-Dauphin  was a bloodless encounter of the French Revolutionary Wars on which a Spanish expedition under Gabriel de Aristizábal seized Fort-Liberté, then named Fort-Dauphin, from Revolutionary France. The French colonial garrisons, consisting of over a thousand men, surrendered without firing a single shot.

Capture
The French, blockaded by land and sea were forced to capitulate. When the Spanish seized the fort, Candy, the French commander, was arrested and sent to Mexico to do hard labour, whereas the rest of prisoners were sent to France as prisoners of war.

Aftermath

With the British having captured Pondicherry in Eastern India and Martinique, Guadeloupe, St. Lucia and other small islands in the West Indies, the capture of Fort Dauphin by the Spanish troops was an added blow to those who received France in its colonies.

Notes

References 

Naval battles of the French Revolutionary Wars
Haitian Revolution
Naval battles involving France
Naval battles involving Spain
Military history of Haiti
Battles and conflicts without fatalities